Kuwait Information Technology Society – KITS – (Arabic: الجمعية الكويتية لتقنية المعلومات) is a public-benefit organization that was established on March 7, 1982 in Kuwait. The organization is managed by an elected board to provide integrated support and consultation to governmental and non-governmental institutions in the fields of information technology as well as to participate and organize field-related competitions local events.

References 

Organizations based in Kuwait City
1982 establishments in Kuwait
Organizations established in 1982
Arab organizations